Transmembrane channel-like protein 6 is a protein that in humans is encoded by the TMC6 gene. In vivo, TMC6 and its homolog TMC8, interact and form a complex with the zinc transporter 1 (SLC30A1) and localize mostly to the endoplasmic reticulum, but also to the nuclear membrane and Golgi apparatus.

Inactivating mutations in TMC6 or TMC8 have been implicated as the genetic cause of the rare skin disorder epidermodysplasia verruciformis, which is characterized by abnormal susceptibility to human papillomaviruses (HPVs) of the skin resulting in the growth of scaly macules and papules, particularly on the hands and feet.

References

Further reading